The Donegal–Mayo rivalry is a Gaelic football rivalry between Irish county teams Donegal and Mayo, whose first championship meeting was in 1992. The fixture has been an infrequent one in the history of the championship, however, the rivalry intensified during a string of championship encounters between 2012 and 2015. Donegal's home ground is MacCumhaill Park and Mayo's home ground is MacHale Park; however, all but one of their championship meetings have been held at neutral venues, usually Croke Park. The first championship meeting between the two counties to take place in either Donegal or Mayo was in 2019 when they played each other in MacHale Park at the All-Ireland quarter-final group stage.

While Mayo have the highest number of Connacht titles and Donegal are sixth on the roll of honour in Ulster, they have also enjoyed success in the All-Ireland Senior Football Championship, having won 5 championship titles between them to date.

They met in the last round of 2015 National Football League fixtures, where a draw earned by a late Stephen Griffin point sent Donegal into the NFL semi-final at Mayo's expense.

All-time results

Legend

Senior

References

Mayo
Mayo county football team rivalries